4L or 4-L can refer to:

4L, another name for Renault 4
 4L is the fourth and final year of a law student in Tanzania, Kenya and Uganda.
4L Trophy
Curtiss R-4L, model of Curtiss Model R
ORC4L
Proje 4L, see Proje4L / Elgiz Museum of Contemporary Art
British Rail Class 202 Diesel-electric multiple units (6L) when reduced to a four-carriage configuration.
4L (band), South Korean girl group
4L, the production code for the 1976 Doctor Who serial The Seeds of Doom
Loyal Legion of Loggers and Lumbermen, an American company union founded in 1917
4L, a 2021 mixtape by American rapper Yeat
4L (film), 2019 Spanish film

See also
L4 (disambiguation)